The Taipei Metro Jiannan Road station is located in the Zhongshan District in Taipei, Taiwan. It is a station on Brown Line and a future transfer station to the Circular Line as part of the second phase.

Station overview

This three-level, elevated station is equipped with two side platforms, three exits, and a platform elevator located on the north side of the concourse level. It is 83 meters in length and 24 meters in width.

Public art at the station is titled "The Sky of Frog", situated on the ceiling of the station at ground level. At a cost of NT$6,000,000, the piece depicts three sets of landscapes: flowing water, mountains, and a pond scene, each depicted from both a man and a frog's perspective.

History
April 2003: Construction begins on the station.
22 February 2009: Jiannan Road station construction is completed.
4 July 2009: Begins service with the opening of Brown Line. Celebrations for the opening of the new line were held at this station.
2029: The station will be a transfer station with the Circular Line

Station layout

Nearby Places
Miramar Entertainment Park
Jiantan Temple
Military History and Translation Office, MND

References

Wenhu line stations
Railway stations opened in 2009